Ole Nydahl (born 19 March 1941), also known as Lama Ole, is a lama providing Mahamudra teachings in the Karma Kagyu school of Tibetan Buddhism. Since the early 1970s, Nydahl has toured the world giving lectures and meditation courses. With his wife, Hannah Nydahl (1946-2007), he founded Diamond Way Buddhism, a worldwide Karma Kagyu Buddhist organization with over 600 centers for lay practitioners.

Nydahl is the author of more than twenty books (in German and English) about Diamond Way Vajrayana Buddhism, with translations into multiple languages. Titles include The Great Seal: Mahamudra View of Diamond Way Buddhism,The Way Things Are, Entering the Diamond Way, Buddha and Love and Fearless Death.

Early life and education
Ole Nydahl was born north of Copenhagen into an academic family. Growing up in Denmark during the second world war, Nydahl witnessed his parents working in the Danish resistance movement, helping transport Jews to neutral Sweden. In the early 1960s, he served briefly in the Danish Army, then studied philosophy, English, and German at the University of Copenhagen, where he completed the examen philosophicum with the best possible grade. He began but did not finish a doctoral thesis on Aldous Huxley's The Doors of Perception. As a young man, Nydahl was involved in boxing, motorcycles, race car driving and also travelled overland from Denmark to Nepal several times. As described in his autobiography Entering the Diamond Way, his travels were financed through smuggling, for which he was once arrested and detained in Denmark. He used this time in pre-trial detention for meditation and read "Tibetan Yoga and Secret Doctrine" by Walter Evans-Wentz.

Involvement with Buddhism

Buddhist education
In 1968, Ole Nydahl and his wife Hannah travelled to Nepal on their honeymoon. In Nepal they met their first Buddhist teacher, the Drukpa Kagyu master Lopon Tsechu Rinpoche. In December 1969, the Nydahls met Rangjung Rigpe Dorje, the 16th Karmapa, head of the Karma Kagyu lineage. Nine years after the British woman Freda Bedi became the first Western student of the 16th Karmapa, the Nydahls took refuge and became students of the Karmapa. They studied and meditated in the Himalayas, where they completed the Ngöndro or preliminary practices in six months, and had explanations and empowerments for 8th Karmapa guru yoga meditation practice and other methods. During this time the Nydahls also became students of Mipham Chokyi Lodro, the fourteenth Shamarpa, the 3rd Jamgon Kongtrul, and Kalu Rinpoche in Sonada. From the Karmapa, the Nydahls learned about Vajrayana Buddhism and mahamudra, and received the Kagyu Ngagdzo transmission. From the Shamarpa, they took the Bodhisattva vows and learned about Gampopa's Jewel Ornament of Liberation. They learned phowa from Ayang Rinpoche in 1972. In addition, the Nydahls received teachings and empowerments from various Tibetan lamas, including Dilgo Khyentse, Bokar Rinpoche, Gyaltrul Rinpoche and the Dalai Lama.

Teaching

Upon returning to Europe in 1972, the 16th Karmapa asked Hannah and Ole Nydahl to begin teaching Buddhism and organize meditation centers, first in their native Denmark, then in Germany and other countries. The centers belong to the Karma Kagyu lineage and operate under Ole Nydahl's practical guidance. In the early 90s, Diamond Way Buddhism was founded as a way to protect established centers during the Karmapa controversy.

, there were 635 Diamond Way centers throughout the world. Most are in Europe, Russia, or the United States.

Ole Nydahl regularly travels between them during the year giving lectures and meditation courses. Until 2013, Nydahl taught conscious dying or phowa, as well as other Buddhist meditation practices, but in recent years he has been focused on giving Mahamudra;  teachings on the nature of mind. He traveled almost constantly for over 40 years, teaching in a new city nearly every day, until 2017 when his health necessitated reducing his travel schedule.

Together with his students, Nydahl has created Buddhist centers that provide access to Vajrayana meditation methods without requiring an understanding of Tibetan language or culture. In the Diamond Way centers, the meditations and names of the various Buddha forms have been translated into Western languages. Ole Nydahl believes it essential for people to understand and read the meditations in their own language in order for Buddhism to become truly rooted in the West, as noted in the preface to the meditation booklet titled Refuge and the Enlightened Attitude, used in Diamond Way Buddhist Centers, in which Nydahl states, "This practice used to have an exotic edge because the repetition was in Tibetan. It has now been brought into a Western context, enabling us to understand it on a much deeper level."

Diamond Way centers are run entirely by volunteers; the organization does not maintain any paid staff. The organizational structure is intended to be democratic and to function on the basis of idealism and friendship. According to Buddhism Today, the Diamond Way Buddhist magazine,  "hierarchical systems will not sell with independent people in the West. Nobody wants a distant teacher on a pedestal or a big organization standing on their shoulders and telling them what to think."

Students in Diamond Way Centers practice the Ngöndro given by Wangchuk Dorje, 9th Karmapa Lama, which are a set of four foundational practices that are intended to prepare the mind for enlightenment, a meditation on the Buddha Loving Eyes (Avalokiteśvara in Sanskrit, Chenrezig in Tibetan) and several forms of guru yoga or meditation on the lama (as given by the 16th Karmapa). In a newsletter dated 9 July 2010, Nydahl responded to questions about the types of practices taught in Diamond Way Centers by stating "I never taught anything I was not asked to pass on by the great Sixteenth Karmapa and that its basis was always the Guru Yogas of the Karmapas. Nothing else is practiced in our now 650 Diamond Way centers world-wide where my students meditate side by side." According to Bee Scherer, "This trajectory is a deliberate yet restrictive selection from the vast richness of Kagyu practices", providing an introductory course into Karma Kagyu practices.

Influence
Jørn Borup, a professor of religion at Aarhus University, says that Ole Nydahl is "the most lasting influence on the Buddhist practice scene in Denmark" and "has in many ways been the icon of living Buddhism in Denmark". The total number of Nydahl's adherents is unknown, but can be estimated conservatively to include 15,000 to 70,000 students and casual sympathizers worldwide. In Germany alone, the German Buddhist Union, (Deutsche Buddhistische Union) estimates that about 20,000 persons regularly visit the Diamond Way centers and groups.

The 14th Shamar Rinpoche, Shamarpa, stated in his biography of the 16th Karmapa that "it was Lama Ole who made the Karmapa's name be renowned and through this, he established some 600 dharma centers," noting that Nydahls work "is also the result of Gyalwa Karmapa's activity."

As well as co-founder of Diamond Way with his wife Hannah Nydahl, Ole Nydahl is co-founder and chairman of the board of The Diamond Way Buddhism Foundation. A non-profit international foundation under German law, it supports projects worldwide, such as a library in Karma Guen (Malaga, Spain), which translates and preserves Buddhist texts; organizes cultural events such as Tibetan art exhibitions; and is responsible for building retreat centers and stupas in Europe and Russia.

Controversy

Lama and lay siddhi-yogi
In 1972, in a letter to Queen Margarethe of Denmark, the 16th Karmapa called Ole and Hannah Nydahl "trusted pupils", entrusting them to establish "a Centre and meditation centre" in Denmark. According to Bee Scherer, a professor of gender studies and religious studies at Canterbury Christ Church University, "Nydahl was not sent back in 1972 already as a "lama" in the sense of a traditionally trained and fully qualified Buddhist teacher." According to Scherer, Nydahl "gained recognition as a Lama (bla ma, traditionally acknowledged teacher)" in the period after the death of the Sixteenth Karmapa in 1981. In August 1983, he was "finally acknowledged as a "Buddhist Master" by the lineage holder Shamar Rinpoche", the 14th Shamarpa, who certified that Nydahl is "appointed Buddhist Master". Scherer notes that since 1995 "the usage of "Lama" by higher Lamas in reference to Nydahl has been documented."

Nydahl's "self-identification and legitimization as a Western Karma bKa' brgyud lay teacher" is an important part of a "continual hagiographical tradition he and his inner circle are writing and rewriting". These hagiographies contribute to the cohesion of the Diamond Way, and "this claim of normative transmission is emphasized in almost every public lecture given by Nydahl himself." According to Scherer, Nydahl presents himself as a lay-siddhi yogi, with a "polarizing style". The yogi-lay element is presented by Nydahl as a legitimization of his position as a teacher within the Karma Kagyu, and "addresses Nydahl's unconventional spiritual formation and education outside the prescribed curriculum of three-year retreats."

Scherer further notes that Nydahls' unconventional role as a siddhi-yogi, and his presentation of Mahamudra-teachings outside "the gradual Tantric trajectory", has historical precedents in the crazy yogis who established Tibetan Buddhism. These precedents are relevant in understanding Nydahl's role as a yogic/lay teacher. Lama Ole's first teacher, Lopon Tsechu Rinpoche, interpreted Nydahl's activity within the context of the Mahāsiddha tradition and the yogi/accomplisher way, stating, "Almost all of the 84 Mahasiddhas followed the lay way, only a few of them were monks and nuns. Nowadays, the lay way is natural and beneficial for many people."

Westernization and neo-orthopraxy

According to Borup, "[Nydahl] and his Diamond Way Buddhism is in no way representative of Buddhism, Tibetan Buddhism or the teachings of the Karma Kagyu lineage." Martin Baumann, a professor of religion at the University of Lucerne, remarked in a newspaper interview "when I listen to his [Nydahl's] alarmingly superficial formulations in his talks I can understand his critics who say that he is presenting a watered-down 'instant Buddhism', a sort of 'Buddhism light' for the West."

In a 2009 article, Scherer, a professor of comparative religion at Canterbury Christ Church University and a student of Thaye Dorje, as well as a former student of Ole Nydahl, examined if these criticisms apply to the core rituals and practices performed in the Diamond Way. Scherer describes a number of practices, some of which have been partly adapted to the west, while others are fully in line with traditional Karma Kagyu practices, concluding that Baumann's critique applies only partly. According to Scherer, Nydahl's Diamond Way practices can best be described as a "neo-orthopraxy", a new, westernized form of traditional practices. He regrets that Nydahl's ideas are not discussed by Tibet scholars, and opines that they have a duty to counterbalance the prevailing negative criticism by sociologists and students of New Religious Movements.

Role in the Karmapa controversy

When a great Tibetan lama dies, it is tradition in Tibetan Buddhism to find the next reincarnation to continue the work. When Rangjung Rigpe Dorje, the Sixteenth Karmapa (head of the Karma Kagyu) died in 1981, two potential successors were found, Ogyen Trinley Dorje and Trinley Thaye Dorje, causing a major split in the Karma Kagyu. Because Shamar Rinpoche was one of Hannah and Ole Nydahl's main teachers, they supported his recognition of Trinley Thaye Dorje as the 17th Karmapa.

Geoffrey Samuel, an academic expert in the field testified in court, while the recognition of Ogyen Trinley "appears to have been accepted by a majority of Karma Kagyu monasteries and lamas, there remains a substantial minority of monasteries and lamas who have not accepted Ogyen Trinley as Karmapa. In particular, these include the Shamar Rinpoche, who historically has been the person most directly involved in the process of recognition."

It was largely because of the work of Hannah and Ole Nydahl that most European Karma Kagyu centers chose to support Trinley Thaye Dorje. As a result, Trinley Thaye Dorje is the "patron" of the centers of the Diamond Way Buddhism.

Due to his role in the Karmapa controversy, Nydahl has been heavily criticized by the supporters of Ogyen Trinley Dorje, such as the authors Mick Brown and Lea Terhune, a student of Tai Situpa. In connection to this, some blame Nydahl for causing the 1992 split of the Karma Kagyu, and accuse him of breaking the samayas to his teachers, which is deprecated in Vajrayana.

Political views 
Some members of the press have criticized Nydahl's version of Diamond Way Buddhism, describing it as featuring "prevalent militaristic appearances, right-wing political views and fierce anti-Islam rhetoric". Others have more positive views of Nydahl's work, describing his dedication to his work and patriotism. Scherer describes Nydahl's representation of himself as "a Buddhist teacher and protector of Western freedom". This addresses his legitimization narrative of himself as emanation of a Buddhist protector and his Kālacakra-linked fierce interpretation of Islam in particular as a key threat to Western freedom and human, especially women's rights. Nydahl has referred to the Islamic religion as "criminal", has called Allah a "terrible god", and has characterized Muslim beliefs as antithetical to freedom of speech and women's rights:

Nydahl says that he does not make political comments in his capacity as a lama, but as a "responsible, thinking human being", and that no one can make such statements from a Buddhist perspective because Buddha Shakyamuni did not comment on religious ideas founded centuries after his death.

An online interview with Nydahl also featured the following statement: "Judaism and Christianity are fine. Islam, I warn against. I know the Koran, I know the life story of Mohammad and I think we cannot use that in our society today."

Dispute with German Buddhist Union 
Between late 1999 and April 2000 there was a public dispute between the German Buddhist Union and the German branch of Diamond Way, which was a member organisation of the Union. Due to Nydahl's disparaging attitude towards Islam, his political statements, his manner of expressing and presenting himself, and his relationships with women,  there were calls for the expulsion of Nydahl's organisation from the Union. The dispute was resolved at a meeting between the two organizations on 4 October 2000; although differences were clear, they agreed to learn from the past and cooperate in the future. The conversation was described as "a first step" that "should eliminate misunderstandings, and lead to clarity and cooperation".  The German branch of Diamond Way (Buddhistischer Dachverband Diamantweg) remained a member of the German Buddhist Union.
In 2019 there were discussions and an application to exclude the Diamond Way from the German Buddhist Union (DBU), based on Nydahl's statements about Islam. DBU members were worried about possible damage to reputation and the German section of Diamond Way decided to leave the DBU.

Personal life
Ole Nydahl met his future wife Hannah when he was 10 and she was five. They met again just after Nydhal came out of the army. Hannah Nydahl died of lung cancer in 2007.

In 2014 Nydahl married Alexandra Munoz Barbosa at the Copenhagen Diamond Way Buddhist center. In 2017 they were divorced.

On 31 August 2019 Ole Nydahl and Anne Behrend were married at the Diamond Way Buddhist center in Těnovice, Czech Republic.

In an interview in 2017 Ole Nydahl mentioned he had fathered two children.

On 18 December 2020 Ole Nydahl and Anne Behrend welcomed the birth of their daughter Freya.

Bibliography
Ole Nydahl has written several books in English, German and Danish, which have been translated into several other European languages.

Selected English titles:
 Entering the Diamond Way: My Path Among the Lamas. Blue Dolphin Publishing (1985). 
 Ngondro: The Four Foundational Practices of Tibetan Buddhism. Blue Dolphin Publishing (1990). 
 Mahamudra: Boundless Joy and Freedom. Blue Dolphin Publishing (1991). 
 Riding the Tiger: Twenty Years on the Road - Risks and Joys of Bringing Tibetan Buddhism to the West. Blue Dolphin Publishing (1992). 
 The Way Things Are: A living Approach to Buddhism for today's world. Blue Dolphin Publishing (2008) 
 The Great Seal: Limitless Space and Joy - The Mahamudra View of Diamond Way Buddhism. Fire Wheel Publishing (2004). 
 The Way Things Are: A living Approach to Buddhism. O Books (2008) 2nd Extended edition. 
 Buddha and Love: Timeless Wisdom for Modern Relationships. Brio Books (2012). 
 Fearless Death: Buddhist Wisdom on the Art of Dying.  Brio Books (2012).

Notes

References

Sources

External links

 
 Neo-orthodox Tradition and Transition: Lama Ole Nydahl and the Diamond Way by Bee Scherer
 

1941 births
Living people
Converts to Buddhism
Danish Buddhists
Danish critics of Islam
20th-century Danish non-fiction writers
21st-century Danish non-fiction writers
Danish clergy
Karma Kagyu lamas
People from Copenhagen
Tibetan Buddhism writers
Tibetan Buddhists from Denmark
20th-century Danish clergy
21st-century Danish clergy